Boundaries is a 2018 comedy-drama film written and directed by Shana Feste and distributed by Sony Pictures Classics and Mongrel Media. Its story follows a mother named Laura and her 14-year-old son Henry, who are forced to drive Laura's irresponsible, marijuana dealing father cross-country after being thrown out of his nursing home. It stars Vera Farmiga, Christopher Plummer, Lewis MacDougall, Bobby Cannavale, Kristen Schaal, Christopher Lloyd, and Peter Fonda.

The film was produced by Automatik Entertainment. It premiered at South by Southwest on March 12, 2018 and was released in the United States on June 22, 2018, and in Canada on July 6, 2018. It grossed $29,552 during its opening weekend and $755,977 worldwide. This was the final film featuring Peter Fonda to be released during his lifetime.

Synopsis

Laura (Farmiga), along with her teenaged son Henry (MacDougall), is forced to drive her pot-dealing father Jack (Plummer) from Seattle to her sister's house in Los Angeles after he is kicked out of a retirement home.

Cast

Production

Development
In April 2016, it was announced that Vera Farmiga and Christopher Plummer would portray lead roles in the drama film Boundaries, with Shana Feste directing from her own screenplay. Brian Kavanaugh-Jones and Bailey Conway were reported to be producing under the American production company Automatik Entertainment, with Chris Ferguson and Kenneth Burke producing under the Canadian production company Oddfellows Entertainment. In May 2016, Lewis MacDougall, Bobby Cannavale, Kristen Schaal, Peter Fonda, Christopher Lloyd, and Dolly Wells were also cast in the film.

Filming
Principal photography began on May 2, 2016 in Vancouver, British Columbia, and was completed on June 3, 2016.

Music
In February 2017, it was reported that Michael Penn would compose the film's score.

Release
In May 2016, Stage 6 Films acquired worldwide distribution rights to the film. Sony Pictures Classics distributed the film in the United States. Boundaries had its world premiere at South by Southwest on March 12, 2018. It was released in the United States on June 22, 2018.

Peter Fonda controversy
On June 20, 2018, Sony Pictures Classics condemned comments Peter Fonda made about President Donald Trump's young son Barron on Twitter the previous day, but announced that they would not edit the film or change its release schedule, noting that Fonda "plays a very minor role."

Reception

Box office
Boundaries made $29,995 from five theaters in its opening weekend, for an average of $5,910 per venue. Deadline Hollywood called it a "moderate start" while LifeZette called the film a "flop" and in-part blamed Fonda's association.

Critical response
The website's critical consensus reads, "Boundaries benefits from a stellar performance by the reliably excellent Christopher Plummer, but his work is overwhelmed by the mediocre movie that surrounds it." On Metacritic, the film has a weighted average score of 50 out of 100, based on 24 critics, indicating "mixed or average reviews".

References

External links
 

2018 films
Films directed by Shana Feste
Films scored by Michael Penn
Films about old age
Films set in Texas
Films set in California
Films shot in Vancouver
2010s road comedy-drama films
American road comedy-drama films
Canadian road comedy-drama films
Stage 6 Films films
Sony Pictures Classics films
2010s English-language films
2010s American films
2010s Canadian films